Meadowbrook station is a regional rail stop along the SEPTA West Trenton Line. It is located at Mill Road & Lindsay Lane in Abington, Pennsylvania. The station has off-street parking. In FY 2013, Meadowbrook station had a weekday average of 141 boardings and 129 alightings. The station building was destroyed by an early morning fire on April 18, 1995 and was replaced by the bus shelter type of facility that currently serves as the waiting area.

Station layout
Meadowbrook has two low-level side platforms.

References

External links
SEPTA – Meadowbrook Station
 Station from Google Maps Street View

SEPTA Regional Rail stations
Former Reading Company stations
Railway stations in Montgomery County, Pennsylvania